Elizabeth Kekaʻaniau Laʻanui Pratt, full name Elizabeth Kekaʻaniauokalani Kalaninuiohilaukapu Kekaikuihala Laʻanui Pratt (September 11, 1834 – December 20, 1928), was a Hawaiian high chiefess (aliʻi) and great-grandniece of Kamehameha I, being a great-granddaughter of Kalokuokamaile, the older brother of Kamehameha I, founder of the Kingdom of Hawaii. She was the daughter of Gideon Peleʻioholani Laʻanui and Theresa Owana Kaheiheimalie Rives.

At a young age, Kekaʻaniau was chosen to attend the Chiefs' Children's School (later renamed the Royal School) taught by American missionaries and declared eligible to succeed to the Hawaiian throne by King Kamehameha III. She married American businessman Franklin Seaver Pratt and became known as Mrs. Pratt. Five of her classmates became reigning monarchs of Hawaii until the 1893 overthrow of the Kingdom of Hawaii. In 1920, she wrote History of Keoua Kalanikupuapa-i-nui: Father of Hawaii Kings, and His Descendants, a book about her ancestor Keōua and his descendants including her own branch of the family and the House of Kamehameha. Outliving all her royal classmates, she was the last surviving member of the Royal School.

Early life and education 
High Chiefess Elizabeth Kekaʻaniauokalani Kalaninuiohilaukapu Kekaikuihala Laʻanui was born September 11, 1834, in her family home at Waialua. Her parents were Gideon Peleʻioholani Laʻanui and Theresa Owana Kaheiheimalie Rives. She was given the name Elizabeth after Kaʻahumanu who had adopted her mother and was baptized with the name.  Kaʻahumanu was a favorite wife of Kamehameha I and the co-ruler of the kingdom under the title of Kuhina Nui. She was also the namesake of Kekaikuihala II, her father's older sister. Her younger brother Gideon Kailipalaki Laʻanui was born in 1840, and despite medical treatment by missionary physician Gerrit P. Judd, their mother died two months afterward from complications from childbirth. Laʻanui later married on July 9, 1842, to Amelia Puohu, who became the children's stepmother.

Her family were of the aliʻi class of the Hawaiian nobility and were collateral relations of the reigning House of Kamehameha, sharing common descent from the early 18th-century aliʻi Keōua Kalanikupuapaʻīkalaninui Ahilapalapa. From her father's side, Kekaʻaniau was a great-granddaughter of Kalokuokamaile, an elder half-brother of Kamehameha I. Both were sons of the aforementioned Keōua. Due to this familial tie, her father Laʻanui escaped the slaughter of Kawaihae in 1791 where Kamehameha I defeated and sacrificed his opponent Keōua Kūʻahuʻula in the process of unifying the Hawaiian Islands. Her mother Owana was the daughter of Kamehameha II's French secretary Jean Baptiste Rives and a relation of Kaʻahumanu through her mother Holau II, who was hānai (adopted) by the queen. Also through her father's first marriage to Namahana Piʻia, Kekaʻaniau was the stepniece of Kaʻahumanu. She was of one-fourth French and three-fourths Native Hawaiian descent.

At a young age, Kekaʻaniau was placed in the Chiefs' Children's School, also known as the Royal School, a select school for the royal children of the highest rank who were eligible to be rulers. Along with her other classmates, she was chosen by Kamehameha III to be eligible for the throne of the Kingdom of Hawaii. Out of the sixteen children of the school, five of her cousins would rule as monarchs of the kingdom. Called Lizzy or Lizzie by her classmates, she was taught by the missionary couple Juliette Montague Cooke and Amos Starr Cooke. In the classroom students were divided by their age and length of time at the school. She was a member of the senior level class. During their Sunday procession to church, when it was customary for boys and girls to walk side by side, she would walk beside James Kaliokalani, the eldest brother of future monarchs Kalākaua and Liliʻuokalani.

During their school years, Kekaʻaniau developed a close relationship with her cousins Emma (who married Kamehameha IV and became queen consort) and Bernice Pauahi Bishop, who later founded Kamehameha Schools. She was one of the few invited guests at the 1850 wedding of Bernice Pauahi to American businessman Charles Reed Bishop, which was conducted against the wishes of Pauahi's parents, and she also later served as bridesmaid to Queen Emma during her royal wedding in 1856. She was also one of the bridesmaids at the 1862 wedding of Liliʻuokalani and John Owen Dominis. Kekaʻaniau was among the young social elite active in the royal courts of Kamehameha IV and his successor Kamehameha V. On formal occasions, she would also serve as lady-in-waiting to Queen Emma.

Marriage 
Kekaʻaniau married Franklin Seaver Pratt (1829–1894) on April 27, 1864. The wedding was held at the residence of the bride, and Reverend Eli S. Corwin, the pastor of the Fort Street (Congregational) Church, officiated the ceremony.
According to contemporary opinion, she was "well-known as one of the brightest and most cultivated women of Honolulu" and "became his faithful companion and helper" after their marriage. A native of Boston, Massachusetts, and naturalized citizen of the kingdom, Pratt was a respected businessman and sugar plantation owner who held a few court and governmental positions during the monarchy, including Staff Colonel to Kamehameha V, member of the Privy Council for Queen Liliʻuokalani, Registrar of Public Accounts and Hawaiian Consul General in San Francisco. However, according to historian James L. Haley, he was kept on the "periphery of power."

The Pratts did not have any children of their own, although they adopted Kekaʻaniau's niece, Theresa Owana Kaʻōhelelani Laʻanui, daughter of her younger brother High Chief Gideon Kailipalaki Laʻanui II, after he died in 1871. Theresa married four times and had descendants by her first and second husbands: Alexander Cartwright III, son of Honolulu fire chief Alexander Cartwright, and Robert William Wilcox, a Hawaiian revolutionary leader and the first Congressional Delegate from the Territory of Hawaii. The Pratts also later adopted Alexander and Theresa's younger daughter Eva Kuwailanimamao Cartwright, who married Dwight Jarvis Styne and had three children. The Pratts owned a beachside residence, which they called the Franklin Villa or Bath Villa, in the Waikīkī area of Honolulu. The property was sold in 1897 and is now part of Fort DeRussy.

Kekaʻaniau was present at the deathbed of King Kamehameha V with Queen Emma Pauahi and other members of the royal court. She later claimed that the dying monarch had offered her the throne before asking Pauahi to succeed him. Haley noted that if this was true she would have a been a strong candidate, being a descendant of an elder brother of the kingdom's founder. Neither woman accepted, and Kamehameha V died without naming an heir. Thus, the 1864 Constitution of the Kingdom of Hawaii called for the legislature to elect the next monarch. By both popular vote and the unanimous vote of the legislature, her cousin Lunalilo became the first elected king of Hawaii. Kekaʻaniau was given a place of honor at the prorogation of the Legislative Assembly of 1873 alongside Queen Emma, High Chiefess Fanny Kekelaokalani, and wives of the king's cabinet ministers. After the death of Lunalilo, the Pratts became supporters of Queen Emma during her unsuccessful candidacy during the royal election of 1874 against Kalākaua. Emma had promised to reward their loyalty with a government appointment by removing John Owen Dominis as Governor of Oahu and appointing Pratt in his place if she had won. Despite popular support for the queen dowager, the assembly voted thirty-nine to six in favor of Kalākaua over Emma. The subsequent announcement triggered the Honolulu Courthouse riot as Emmaite supporters hunted down and attacked native legislators who supported Kalākaua. In order to quell the civil disruption, American and British troops were landed with the permission of the Hawaiian government, and the rioters were arrested.

During the final years of the monarchy, the Pratts lived in San Francisco where her husband served as Hawaiian Consul General for the Pacific states of Oregon, Washington, California and Nevada, from 1892 until the time of the overthrow of the Kingdom of Hawaii.

In March 1893, she was elected as an honorary president of Hui Aloha ʻĀina o Na Wahine (Hawaiian Women's Patriotic League) or Hui Aloha ʻĀina for Women. This patriotic group was founded shortly after its male counterpart the Hui Aloha ʻĀina for Men to oppose the overthrow and plans to annex the islands to the United States and to support the deposed queen Liliʻuokalani. She resigned this position on April 17, 1893 after a dispute arose between two factions of the group over the wordings to the memorial seeking the restoration of the monarchy to be presented to the United States Commissioner James Henderson Blount sent by President Grover Cleveland to investigate the overthrow.

Later life and civic involvement 

After the overthrow in 1893, her husband defended Kekaʻaniau's traditional claims to the Hawaiian crown lands as an heir of Kamehameha III and was removed from his government post as Hawaiian Consul. These lands transferred to the United States Federal Government after the annexation of the Hawaiian Islands in 1898. During Queen Liliʻuokalani's attempts to seek restitution and compensation for the lost crown lands, Kekaʻaniau and her niece Theresa Laʻanui petitioned in 1903 the Senate Subcommittee on the Pacific Islands and Puerto Rico in order to support the petition of the queen. 

In 1895, she helped founded the Hawaiian Relief Society to assist the victims of a cholera epidemic in the islands. She co-founded the organization with other leading Hawaiian women including Emma Kaili Metcalf Beckley Nakuina, Abigail Kuaihelani Campbell and Emilie Widemann Macfarlane. She served as the organization's first vice-president.

Because of her rank and connection to the past, Kekaʻaniau participated in many civic ceremonies during her later life. On June 28, 1909, Kekaʻaniau officiated and unveiled the tablet of the 1795 Battle of Nuʻuanu, which was installed at the Pali lookout by the organization Daughters of Hawaii. On March 17, 1912, she officiated with Queen Liliʻuokalani when they both unveiled the Cooke Memorial Tablet, dedicated to Amos Starr and Juiette Montague Cooke and the sixteen students of the Royal School, in the vestibule of Kawaiahaʻo Church. The ceremony marked the 100th anniversary of the birth of Mrs. Cooke. On March 17, 1914, Kekaʻaniau officiated with Liliʻuokalani at the unveiling of the tablet for the 100th commemoration birthday of King Kamehameha III. During the ceremony, Queen Liliʻuokalani represented the Kalakaua Dynasty, and Kekaʻaniau represented the Kamehameha Dynasty, seated on opposite sides of the memorial stone in the nave of the church. The palace chairs in which they sat were draped with ancient Hawaiian feather capes. The Queen drew the cord releasing her Royal Standard or personal flag, while Kekaʻaniau released the Hawaiian flag covering the tablet.
In 1897, Kekaʻaniau donated to the Bishop Museum the bust figure of Kamehameha II that was given by the British monarch, King George IV, when Kamehameha II died while on his state visit in London with his queen Kamāmalu in 1825. The British crown bought the lavish coffins and made the bust according to the English royal traditions during funeral services. She also donated to the Bishop Museum the following items: 2 pictures, 6 feather leis, 15 kāhili's, 5 kāhili handles, 13 ʻumeke, 5 coconut bowls and 1 Niʻihau mat.  In 1996, two of her kahili's were featured in the museum exhibit in "The Legacy of Excellence, Highlights of Hawaiian Culture" and was described as being "the only ones of their kind".

Following the death of Liliʻuokalani in 1917, Kekaʻaniau became the only survivor of the Royal School. In 1920, Kekaʻaniau wrote History of Keoua Kalanikupuapa-i-nui: Father of Hawaii Kings, and His Descendants, with Notes on Kamehameha I, First King of All Hawaii, as a tribute to her great-grandfather Keōua Kalanikupuapaʻīkalaninui Ahilapalapa and his descendants. The book consisted of a genealogical history of the branches of the House of Keōua Nui including her family and the House of Kamehameha.

Death and funeral 

In her later years, Kekaʻaniau lived at the home of her grandniece Eva Kuwailanimamao Cartwright Styne at 1036 Kinau Street, Makiki, Honolulu. On her 94th birthday on September 11, 1928, a large contingent of Honolulu residents made a pilgrimage to her home to bedeck the residence with floral tributes and offer expressions of affection and respect. The Honolulu Star-Bulletin noted the home of the nonagenarian "was a veritable bower of flowers, redolent with beauteous blossoms." One of her last functions, in October of the same year, was helping arrange partners for a quadrille in a historic reenactment of the court of Kamehameha IV and Queen Emma. Kekaʻaniau had been a participant in the original 1856 quadrille where she had danced with Kalākaua.
After a brief illness, Kekaʻaniau died at the age of 94 at the home of her grandniece at 9am on December 20, 1928.

Although not given a state funeral, the tradition of lying in state was observed on the night before the funeral. The watches were led by members of two Hawaiian royal societies of which she had been a ranking member: the Māmakakaua (Daughters and Sons of Hawaiian Warriors) and the ʻAhahui Kaʻahumanu (Kaʻahumanu Society), of which Kekaʻaniau was the first honorary president. Princess Elizabeth Kahanu Kalanianaʻole (Moʻi of Māmakakaua) and Emma Ahuena Taylor (Kuhina Nui of Māmakakaua) led the watches.

The funeral services were conducted at Kawaiahaʻo Church by Reverend Akaiko Akana at 3:30 pm on December 23. The silver-gray coffin was draped with two ʻahuʻula, or feather cloaks, symbolizing the rank she held in the two royal societies. Territorial Governor and Mrs. Wallace Rider Farrington, former Governor and Mrs. Walter F. Frear, and former Honolulu Mayor John C. Lane joined prominent families of chiefly lineage and members of the two royal societies at the services. Lane and Colonel Curtis P. Iaukea served as two of the six pallbearers. After the simple ceremony, which only lasted half an hour, the mourners accompanied the casket to its final burial place where Akana read the burial service in Hawaiian. Per her request, Kekaʻaniau was buried with solemn ceremony next to her husband at Oʻahu Cemetery.

Descendants and legacy 

The descendants from her niece Theresa Laʻanui to Cartwright and Wilcox continue to claim to be the rightful successors of the Kamehameha line and claimant to the Hawaiian crown lands. They base their claims through Kekaʻaniau's status as the last surviving member of the Royal School chosen by Kamehameha III to be eligible for the throne of the Kingdom of Hawaii. One notable contemporary member of this family is Hawaiian musician and activist Owana Salazar, who with her son were involved with the Hawaiian activist group Ka Lāhui Hawaiʻi from 1988 to 1998.

Kekaʻaniau's 1920 book was republished in 1999 under the title Keoua: Father of Kings by her great-great-grandnephew, David Castro. It was republished again in 2009. Castro also wrote a biography of her titled Princess Elizabeth Kekaaniau Laanui: Member of the Kamehameha Dynasty, Eligible to Hawaiian the Throne in 2008.

On September 15, 1985, a portrait painted of Kekaʻaniau was unveiled at the Kawaiahaʻo Church by Helena Kalokuokamaile Wilcox (mother of Owana Salazar). The artwork was created by commissioned artist Mary Koski, who was known for her Flemish-Dutch and realistic style of painting. This painting now stands on an easel within the royal pew of Kawaiahaʻo Church, where Kekaʻaniau once sat with King Kamehameha III and other students of the Royal School. In 1989, a second painting was installed in the library of the modern day Royal Elementary School in Honolulu.

Family tree

References

Bibliography

Further reading

External links 

1834 births
1928 deaths
Heirs to the Hawaiian throne
Native Hawaiian writers
Royalty of the Hawaiian Kingdom
Writers from Hawaii
House of Kalokuokamaile
Burials at Oahu Cemetery
Hawaiian Kingdom people of French descent
Hawaiian ladies-in-waiting
Royal School (Hawaii) alumni
People from Honolulu